Chandrakantham is a 1974 Indian Malayalam film, directed by Sreekumaran Thampi and produced by Rajashilpi. The film stars Prem Nazir, Jayabharathi, Adoor Bhasi and Balakrishnan in the lead roles. The film has musical score by M. S. Viswanathan.

Plot synopsis
Vinayan, a writer, takes care of his twin brother Ajayan, whose behavior is different from his. Vinayan is shocked when he finds that his brother loves the same girl that he was planning to marry.

Cast

Prem Nazir as Vinayan, Ajayan (double role)
Jayabharathi as Rajani
Adoor Bhasi as Dr. Jacob
Balakrishnan
Kedamangalam Sadanandan
Sankaradi as Sreesankara Pilla
T. R. Omana as School Teacher
P. K. Joseph
T. S. Muthaiah as Menon
Kedamangalam Ali
Baby Sumathi as Young Vinayan, Bindu (double role)
Bahadoor as Raghavan
Master Rajakumaran Thampi as Young Ajayan
Satheesh
Sumithra as Dhobi's sister
Kunchan as Krishnankutty

Soundtrack

References

External links

view the film

1974 films
1970s Malayalam-language films
Films scored by M. S. Viswanathan
Films directed by Sreekumaran Thampi